Briza is a genus of annual and perennial plants in the grass family, native to northern temperate regions of Eurasia, North Africa, and certain islands in the Atlantic.

The group is generally referred to as the quaking grasses because the flowers and seedheads shake on their stalks in the slightest breeze. Some of its members are grown as ornamental plants.

Briza species are used as food plants by the larvae of some Lepidoptera species including Coleophora lixella.

Species
 Briza humilis M.Bieb. – from Albania to Iran
 Briza marcowiczii Woronow – Turkey, Caucasus
 Briza maxima L. – Mediterranean, Azores, Madeira, Canary Islands; naturalized in parts of Asia, Africa, Australia, the Americas, and certain oceanic islands
 Briza media L. – Europe, Asia, North Africa, Azores, Canary Islands; naturalized in New Zealand and parts of North America
 Briza minor L. – from Azores + Canary Islands to Iran; naturalized in parts of Asia, Africa, Australia, the Americas, and certain oceanic islands

Over 100 species formerly included in Briza are now placed in other genera, including Agrostis, Airopsis, Chascolytrum, Desmazeria, Desmostachya, Distichlis, Eragrostis, Glyceria, Halopyrum, Neesiochloa, Poa, Tribolium, Trisetum and Uniola.

See also
List of Poaceae genera

References

External links
 

Pooideae
Poaceae genera
Grasses of Africa
Grasses of Asia
Grasses of Europe
Taxa named by Carl Linnaeus